Javier Almerge Viñuales (born 28 February 2001) is a Spanish professional footballer who plays for SD Huesca B as a right back.

Club career
Born in Sena, Huesca, Aragon, Almerge graduated with SD Huesca's youth setup. On 10 September 2017, aged just 16, he made his debut as a senior by coming on as a late substitute with the farm team in a 3–1 home win against CD Robres in the Tercera División.

Despite being only 17, Almerge finished his first senior campaign with 21 appearances, with more than 1,500 minutes of action. He made his first-team debut on 6 December 2018, starting in a 0–4 home loss against Athletic Bilbao in the season's Copa del Rey.

References

External links

2001 births
Living people
People from Monegros
Sportspeople from the Province of Huesca
Spanish footballers
Footballers from Aragon
Association football defenders
Tercera División players
AD Almudévar players
SD Huesca footballers
Spain youth international footballers